Viola ucriana is a species of plant in the Violaceae family. It is a violet that is endemic to Sicily in Italy, where its known in Italian as Viola di Ucria.

Distribution
Its natural habitats are in Mediterranean shrubby vegetation and rocky areas here.

Endangered
It is an IUCN Red List Critically Endangered plant species and IUCN Top 50 Campaign Mediterranean Island Plants, threatened by habitat loss.

Description
Viola ucriana is perennial, evergreen herbaceous plant, with elongated upper leaves and lower leaves gathered forming a cushion at the base. The greyish green leaves are partially hairy. The flowers are yellow, with yellowish-green spur. The plants predominantly flowers in late Spring, between April and June.

References

External links

IUCN - Top 50 Mediterranean Island Plants: Viola ucriana

ucriana
Endemic flora of Sicily
Critically endangered plants
Critically endangered biota of Europe
Taxonomy articles created by Polbot